Peter Gordon may refer to:

Sports
 Peter Gordon (English footballer) (1932–1990), English association football player
 Peter Gordon (South African footballer) (born 1963), South African football defender
 Peter Gordon (sailor) (1882–1975), Canadian sailor and silver medalist in the 1932 Olympics
Peter Gordon (discus thrower), British athlete and champion at the 1981 UK Athletics Championships

Others
 Peter Gordon (chef) (born 1963), celebrity chef from New Zealand
 Peter Gordon (composer) (born 1951), composer and musician based in New York City
 Peter Gordon (historian), historian and professor at Harvard University
 Peter Gordon (lawyer) (born 1957), Australian lawyer and former Western Bulldogs president
 Peter Gordon (radio presenter), radio presenter in Surrey, England
 Peter Gordon (politician) (1921–1991), New Zealand politician
 Peter Gordon (playwright), British playwright

See also 
 Peter and Gordon, musical duo from the United Kingdom
 Peter Gordon MacKay (born 1965), Canadian cabinet minister